The 12805 / 12806 Janmabhoomi Express is an InterCity service of Indian Railways that travels from Lingampalli to Visakhapatnam. It was first introduced between Visakhapatnam and Vijayawada Jn. It was later extended up to Tenali Jn and then the Nagarjuna Express (Secunderabad––Secunderabad) was cancelled and thus made the Visakhapatnam–Secunderabad Janmabhoomi Express via Tenali Junction, and now it is extended from Secunderabad Junction to Lingampalli. It is an express service that travels in Andhra Pradesh and Telangana. The train travels at an average speed of 55 km/h and uses a WDP4D (EMD GT46MAC) of Gooty from Lingampalli to Tenali Jn then switches to a WAP4 of Erode from Tenali Jn to Vishakapatnam Jn . It is classified as a Express in the Indian Railways classification list.

Janmabhoomi has 24 coaches, of which 8 are unreserved, 2 are luggage cum baggage coaches, 11 Non AC chair car second class coaches and 3 AC chair car. Daily one train will start at Visakhapatnam and one train will start from Lingampalli station. At Lingampalli will start by 6:15 a.m. and it will reach Visakhapatnam by 19:40 p.m. and train from Visakhapatnam will start by 6:15 a.m. and it will reach Lingampalli by 19:40 p.m.

Coaches
Janmabhoomi has 22 coaches, of which 8 are Unreserved General Coaches, 9 second class (2nd Seating) coaches, 3 AC Chair Car coaches along with 2 EoG cum luggage coaches. All coaches are LHB coaches.

Traction
Earlier it was hauled by WDP-4D of Gooty Shed from Secunderabad Junction to Tenali Junction because the Secunderabad Junction– route was not electrified and WAP-4 of Erode Shed from Tenali Junction to Visakhapatnam.

Currently the route is electrified and it is hauled by a Lallaguda Loco Shed-based WAP-7 electric  locomotive on its entire journey.

Statistics 
This is a day intercity express. It has only second seating and chair car which can be reserved. there is no pantry car for this train. This train stops at Ramannapet, Nadikude Jn, Piduguralla, Sattenapalli, Guntur Jn, where it switches engines if needed to. (Longest stop: 15 minutes) Vijayawada Jn, Samalkota Jn, Tuni, Yelamanchili, Anakapalli, .

Other lines 
Janmabhoomi Express is a popular train to take but can be very busy. Alternatives include the Godavari Express, Visakhapatnam–Hazur Sahib Nanded Superfast Express and the Konark Express (which stops at Visakhapatnam, but usually follows the normal route of Konark which is Mumbai to Bhubaneswar). The Secunderabad–Visakhapatnam Duronto Express is also an option as is the Visakhapatnam–Secunderabad Garib Rath Express. Duronto is faster but does not have full accommodations; Garib Rath is slower but has full accommodations.

See also

 List of named passenger trains of India
 South Central Railway Zone

References

 

Transport in Visakhapatnam
Transport in Secunderabad
Railway services introduced in 2007
Rail transport in Andhra Pradesh
Rail transport in Telangana
Named passenger trains of India
Express trains in India